Jizera may refer to places in the Czech Republic:

Jizera (river), a river
Jizera Mountains, a mountain range
Jizera Table, a plateau